Bachelor Party 2: The Last Temptation is a 2008 sex comedy directed by James Ryan.  The film, a sequel-in-name-only to a comedy made 24 years earlier (Bachelor Party), stars Josh Cooke as the bachelor and Sara Foster as his fiancée.

Plot
A guy named Ron finally settled up and decided to marry his girlfriend Melinda, whom he met just two months ago. Her brother, Todd, hates Ron and tries to persuade Melinda that he is just marrying her to use her money for himself. He tries to talk Melinda out of the wedding, but before that, he tries to show who Ron really is so he decided to make a wild bachelor party, in hope of catching Ron and canceling the wedding.

Cast
Josh Cooke as Ron
Harland Williams as Derek
Greg Pitts as Jason
Danny Jacobs as Seth
Warren Christie as Todd
Sara Foster as Melinda
Emmanuelle Vaugier as Eva
Max Landwirth as Tommy
Karen-Eileen Gordon as Autumn
Steven Crowley as Billy
Audrey Landers as Bettina
Mauricio Sanchez as The Plumber
Chay Santini as Betty
Kim Ostrenko as Irene

Production
Principal photography occurred in Miami, Florida starting in March 2007.

Reception
The trade publication Video Business said the film "moves at a fast clip, but the jokes are lackluster, leaving only the female cast members’ topless scenes as a potential selling point."

A reviewer for The Observer, an independent student-run newspaper covering Rutgers University, called it "one of the worst movies I have ever seen" and noted that it was only Sara Foster's appearance in the film that kept him watching.

IGN in its review of the DVD said "A film that probably shouldn't have been made, yet there are going to be loads of people out there who will enjoy this disaster because, as the old advertising motto states, "sex sells."

References

External links 
 

American sex comedy films
American direct-to-video films
Direct-to-video sequel films
2000s sex comedy films
2008 films
20th Century Fox direct-to-video films
Films scored by James Dooley
Films set in Miami
Films shot in Florida
Films shot in Miami
Films with screenplays by Pat Proft
Films with screenplays by Neal Israel
2008 comedy films
2000s English-language films
2000s American films